Shelby Airport  is a county-owned airport two miles north of Shelby, in Toole County, Montana. The National Plan of Integrated Airport Systems for 2011–2015 called it a general aviation airport.

Facilities
It has two asphalt runways: 5/23 is 5,005 by 75 feet (1,526 x 23 m) and 11/29 is 3,701 by 60 feet (1,128 x 18 m).

In the year ending September 9, 2011 the airport had 8,500 aircraft operations, average 23 per day: 95% general aviation, 3% military, and 2% air taxi. 16 aircraft were then based at this airport: 87.5% single-engine and 12.5% multi-engine.

References

External links 
 
 
 

Airports in Montana
Transportation in Toole County, Montana